Core of Soul (formerly Core of Sun) is a Japanese pop/downtempo band. The group formed when Song met Nakamura and Iizuka at a school in Osaka. They disbanded March 24, 2006 after completing their Asian tour in Osaka.

Members 
  - Vocals
  - Guitar and Bass,  Beijing native
  - Programmer

Discography

Albums 
 Natural Beauty (2002) Reached #35
 Over The Time "Time Is Over" (2003) Reached #49
 Rainbow (2003) Reached #99
 3 (2004) Reached #134
 One Love, One Day, One Life (2006) Reached #134
 The Best (2006)

Singles 
 "Photosynthesis" (2001) Reached #82
 "Natural Beauty" (2001)  Failed to chart
 "Full Moon Prayer" (2001) Reached #62
 "Flying People" (2002) Reached #60
 "Hanawa / Tsuki de Matsu Kimi" (花環 / 月で待つ君) (2003) Reached #87
 "Make Me a Woman" (2003) Reached #85
 "Purple Sky" (2004) Reached #91
 "Ageha" (アゲハ) (2005) Reached #90
 "Yumenori Riders" (夢乗りRiders) (2005) Reached #146

External links
 Project J's page on CORE OF SOUL

Japanese pop music groups
Musical groups from Osaka